Ronnbergia involucrata is a species of flowering plant in the family Bromeliaceae, endemic to Ecuador. It was first described in 1888 as Aechmea involucrata.

References

Bromelioideae
Flora of Ecuador